Roccella is a genus of 23 species of lichens in the family Roccellaceae. The genus was circumscribed by Swiss botanist Augustin Pyramus de Candolle in 1805, with Roccella fuciformis as the type species.

Species
Roccella albida 
Roccella bajasurensis 
Roccella botrytis 
Roccella colonii 
Roccella elisabethae 
Roccella floreana 
Roccella floribrassica 
Roccella fuciformis 
Roccella fusca 
Roccella geniculata  – Galápagos Islands
Roccella glebaria  – Galápagos Islands
Roccella gracilis 
Roccella hertelii 
Roccella incurvata 
Roccella kappeniana  – Galápagos Islands
Roccella maderensis 
Roccella minuta 
Roccella montagnei 
Roccella phycopsioides 
Roccella phycopsis 
Roccella sanctae-helenae 
Roccella stipitata  – Galápagos Islands
Roccella tinctoria 
Roccella translucida

References

Ascomycota genera
Lichen genera
Taxa named by Augustin Pyramus de Candolle
Taxa described in 1805